Matuizos is a village in Varėna district municipality, in Alytus County, in southeastern Lithuania. According to the 2011 census, the village has a population of 1201 people.

The village has a library, events hall, a medical station, Matuizos high school and museum of the school.

History 
The village was established in the beginning of the 19th century. Until the beginning of the Second World War it was named Baculioniai.

References

Villages in Alytus County
Varėna District Municipality